Kinta 1881 is a 2007 Malaysian martial arts-action film. The film was the first Malaysian film in martial arts genre, such as Cicak Man for first Malaysian superhero film. Although being a Malaysian film, its language is Chinese.  It was ported to the US, dubbed, and retitled Four Dragons in 2008.

Plot 
The film is set in the Kinta Valley in the 1880s, when tin ore was discovered in the area and Chinese immigrants flooded the valley in the hope of making their fortune.

References

External links
 Kinta (2008)

2007 films
2007 martial arts films
Malaysian martial arts films
Chinese-language Malaysian films
Historical epic films